Jur Deh or Jowr Deh may refer to:
 Jur Deh, Rasht
 Jur Deh, Rudsar
 Jur Deh, alternate name of Jir Deh, Rudsar